Storvätteshågna (in Sami: Gealta) is a peak of the Långfjället massif in the southern part of the Scandinavian mountain range, near Grövelsjön in Idre parish, Älvdalen Municipality.  It is the highest point in Dalarna and Svealand, with an altitude of 1,204 metres.

References 

Landforms of Dalarna County
Mountains of Sweden